Unwanted (Albanian: T'padashtun) is a 2017 Kosovan romantic drama film directed by Edon Rizvanolli. It was selected as the Kosovan entry for the Best Foreign Language Film at the 90th Academy Awards, but it was not nominated.

Plot
Alban, a teenage boy from Kosovo, had lived in the Netherlands with his mother since the Kosovo War. When Alban begins a romance with a sensitive young woman named Anna,  dark memories of the past rise to the surface.

Cast
 Adriana Matoshi as Zana
 Jason de Ridder as Alban
 Niki Verkaar as Ana
 Hugo Koolschijn as Rudi

See also
 List of submissions to the 90th Academy Awards for Best Foreign Language Film
 List of Kosovan submissions for the Academy Award for Best Foreign Language Film

References

External links
 

2017 films
2017 drama films
2017 romance films
2017 romantic drama films
Kosovan drama films
Kosovan romance films
Kosovan romantic drama films
Albanian-language films
2010s Dutch-language films
2017 directorial debut films
2017 multilingual films